Adios Amigo is a 1976 American Western comedy film written, produced and directed by Fred Williamson, who also stars in the lead role. The film co-stars Richard Pryor and James Brown.

Premise
A frontier con man (Richard Pryor) tries scams that never work, leaving his partner (Fred Williamson) behind to explain.

Cast
 Fred Williamson as Ben "Big Ben"
 Richard Pryor as Sam Spade
 James Brown as Sheriff
 Robert Phillips as Notary
 Mike Henry as Mary's Husband

Production
The idea for the project came from Pryor's initial frustration of being rejected from starring in Mel Brooks's Blazing Saddles after collaborating with him on the screenplay, and Williamson's dislike of the finished film, which he considered silly. The goal was to make a comedy that would still be realistic to its Western setting, and which would allow Pryor to work without restraint. The initial script was only 12 pages, with Williamson encouraging Pryor to ad-lib scenarios in a suggested scene. Principal photography took only nine days.

Reception
Ultimately, both Williamson and Pryor were disappointed with the results. "I wanted to give him an idea, a concept, and then just turn the light on him and let him do whatever he wanted. You know what they say about comedians that you can just open the refrigerator door and the light comes on, the jokes roll on out. Well, Richard's light didn't come on," said Williamson. In an interview with Ebony shortly after the movie came out, Pryor said, "Tell them I apologize. Tell them I needed some money. Tell them I promise not to do it again."

Despite the negative opinions of its stars, the film garnered a positive review from Gene Siskel. During a Sneak Previews "Dog of the Week" segment, often devoted to low-budget films cashing in on name star appearances, Siskel mentioned approaching Adios Amigo as a potential "dog" because it didn't sound like a good movie in previews, but found it to be a very funny and enjoyable film that resulted in him stating that he had no "dog" selection after all for that week's show.

References

External links 
 
 
 

1976 films
1970s Western (genre) comedy films
American Western (genre) comedy films
Blaxploitation films
Films directed by Fred Williamson
American slapstick comedy films
1976 comedy films
1970s English-language films
1970s American films